Springdale is a town in Washington County, Utah, United States.  The population was 529 at the 2010 census. It is located immediately outside the boundaries of Zion National Park, and is oriented around the resulting tourist industry. It was originally settled as a Mormon farming community in 1862 by evacuees from the flooding of nearby Northrop.

History
In the Balanced Rock Hills area of Springdale, a landslide covered part of Utah State Route 9, taking several hours to complete movement.

Geography

According to the United States Census Bureau, the town has a total area of 4.6 square miles (12.0 km2), all land. Springdale is set in Zion Canyon with Mount Kinesava to the west, and The Watchman to the east. The North Fork Virgin River courses through town shortly before the confluence with the Virgin's East Fork.

Springdale sits at the western edge of the Colorado Plateau, in the transition zone between the plateau, the Great Basin and the Mojave Desert.

Demographics

As of the census of 2010, there were 529 people, 252 households, and 137 families residing in the town. The population density was 115 people per square mile (44.1/km2). There were 327 housing units at an average density of 71.1 per square mile (27.3/km2). The racial makeup of the town was 90.2% White, 0.9% African American, 0.6% Native American, 0.8% Asian, 5.7% from other races, and 1.9% from two or more races. Hispanic or Latino of any race were 11.2% of the population.

There were 252 households, out of which 15.1% had children under the age of 18 living with them, 44.0% were married couples living together, 6.7% had a female householder with no husband present, and 45.6% were non-families. 34.2% of all households were made up of individuals, and 8.7% had someone living alone who was 65 years of age or older. The average household size was 2.38 and the average family size was 2.67.

In the town, the population was spread out, with 15.3% under the age of 18, 4.5% from 20 to 24, 24.2% from 25 to 44, 35.4% from 45 to 64, and 18.9% who were 65 years of age or older. The median age was 47.8 years. For every 100 females, there were 106.6 males. For every 100 women age 18 and over, there were 106.5 men.

As of 2000, the median income for a household in the town was $41,607, and the median income for a family was $51,500. Males had a median income of $34,063 versus $26,667 for females. The per capita income for the town was $25,593. About 8.3% of families and 9.0% of the population were below the poverty line, including 12.0% of those under age 18 and 12.3% of those age 65 or over.

Government
The mayor is Barbara Bruno, and the council members are Randy Aton, Suzanne Elger, Jack Burns, and Lisa Zumpft.

References

External links

 Springdale Town Website

Towns in Washington County, Utah
Towns in Utah
Populated places established in 1862
1862 establishments in Utah Territory